Luke Easter may refer to:

Luke Easter (baseball) (1915–1979), American baseball player
Luke Easter (musician), vocalist for the band Tourniquet